John Bruce (or Brousse) (1837 – 26 October 1893) was the first president of the Métis provisional government at the Red River Colony during the Red River Rebellion of 1869. He resigned because he was sick and his secretary, Louis Riel, became the president.

The son of Pierre Bruce and Marguerite Desrosiers, he was a carpenter by trade. Bruce married Angélique Gaudry. He was a member of the Legislative Assembly of Assiniboia and served as Superintendent of Public Works for the Provisional Government of Manitoba.

Bruce was recorded in 1849 as living in St. Boniface. In 1877, he received his patent for a lot in St. Norbert in 1877. He was recorded as living at St. Joseph, North Dakota in 1879–80. Bruce died in Leroy, North Dakota, in 1893 after falling ill the previous year.

References 

1837 births
1893 deaths
People of the Red River Rebellion
Indigenous leaders in Manitoba
Métis politicians
Members of the Legislative Assembly of Assiniboia

Canadian Métis people
People from Saint Boniface, Winnipeg